The Brussels Marathon is an annual AIMS-certified marathon held in Brussels, Belgium, first held in 1984, and usually held in the autumn.  Races of shorter distances are also held on the same day.

History 
The full race was first held in 1984.

The race was not held from 1995 to 2003.

In 2004, the race was restarted as part of the ING Running Tour, organized by ING Belgium and the Royal Belgian Athletics League.

Public controversy arose in social networks in 2017, where podium awards appeared and differed significantly between females and males. Following a change of sponsorship by Brussels Airport in 2018, the organisers (Golazo Sports) announced that awards would be aligned equally for both sexes.  In 2018, the organisers defended the non-publication of full race results including category positions on the grounds of recent changes in European privacy laws, although inconsistent with standard practice as well as the publication of other race results by the same organiser.

The 2020 edition of the race was postponed to 2021.10.03 due to the coronavirus pandemic, with all entries automatically remaining valid for 2021.

Course 

The marathon makes a loop, starting and ending in the City of Brussels, in the proximity of Brussels Park. Initially the runners head eastwards, to Tervuren. Alongside the track, the participants pass several green areas: the Cinquantenaire Park, the Woluwe Park, the Capuchin Forest, the Royal Belgian Golf Club and the Bois de la Cambre. Since 2017, the course has started and finished in the Cinquantenaire Park, initially heading west anti-clockwise around the city, with the full marathon deviating out-and-back to Tervuren. Since 2018, the start and finish has coincided with the more renowned 20 km of Brussels held in May.

Additional distances 
A half marathon, a Mini Marathon (6.5 km) and a Kids Run (1 km) are also held.

Qualification 
The full Brussels Marathon is open to runners 18 or older from any nation.  Competitors for the half marathon have to be at least 16 years of age.

Attendance 
More people participate in the half marathon than in the full marathon. As of 2014, the half marathon had its largest attendance in 2012 with 8006 participants, and the full Brussels Marathon had its largest attendance in 2010 with 2546 runners.

Environmental impact 

In response to increasing public concerns on the amount of unnecessary waste at such public sports events, the organisers are aiming at a plastic-free event from 2019 onwards, with drinking water served in cardboard cups, no goody bags and avoiding the need for aluminium foil protection after the race by ensuring participants' sports bags are readily accessible.

Winners

Source:

Key: Course record (in bold)

Marathon

Initial era

Current era

Half marathon

Notes

See also
 List of marathon races in Europe
 20 km of Brussels

References

External links
  Brussels Airport Brussels Marathon & Half Marathon
 Association of Road Racing Statisticians ARRS

Recurring sporting events established in 1984
Annual events in Brussels
1984 establishments in Belgium
Marathons in Belgium
Annual sporting events in Belgium
Tervuren
Autumn events in Belgium